Kyle Zenoni (born February 16, 1984, in Hartland, Wisconsin) is a former American soccer player and current soccer coach who last played for Bolivian side La Paz F.C., after a switch from USL First Division club Minnesota Thunder. He is the head men's soccer coach of the UMass Lowell River Hawks.

Biography
Zenoni attended college at the University of Wisconsin–Milwaukee. He captained the Panthers in 2005. He appeared in all 23 games at the mid-field position, making 22 starts. He scored 10 goals in four years, taking 71 shots. Kyle had 8 assists while playing at UWM and started 59 out of 83 games. Zenoni was then selected by the Chicago Storm in the second round of the 2006 Major Indoor Soccer League draft.

After a brief stint in Europe, particularly in Sweden and Ireland, Kyle returned to the United States to play for the Minnesota Thunder in the United Soccer League (USL) First Division.

On December 25, 2007, Zenoni signed for La Paz in order to strengthen their squad for the upcoming Copa Libertadores, the principal competition for South American club teams. He was the only foreign footballer playing for La Paz, and currently coaches in his home state of Wisconsin.

Notes

External links
 Profile at BoliviaGol.com 

1984 births
Living people
American soccer players
American expatriate soccer players
Minnesota Thunder players
Association football midfielders
Milwaukee Panthers men's soccer players
Soccer players from Wisconsin
People from Hartland, Wisconsin
UMass Lowell River Hawks men's soccer coaches